National Core Indicators (NCI) is a collaborative effort between the National Association of State Directors of Developmental Disabilities Services (NASDDDS) and the Human Services Research Institute (HSRI) in the United States.  The purpose of the program, which began in 1997, is to support NASDDDS member agencies (state developmental disabilities agencies) to gather a standard set of performance and outcome measures that can be used to track their own performance over time, to compare results across states, and to establish national benchmarks.

The primary aim of NCI is to collect and maintain valid and reliable data about the performance of public developmental disabilities service systems. NCI states and project partners use NCI data not only to improve practice at the state level but also to add knowledge to the field, to influence state and national policy, and to inform strategic planning initiatives for NASDDDS.

Through participation in the program, NCI states make a commitment to share information with stakeholders so that data can be used for policy change and quality improvement. To that end, the National Core Indicators website provides public access to NCI data and current information about how the results are being used at the state and national levels to support policy, research, and advocacy efforts.

The National Core Indicators framework 
The NCI framework comprises an In Person Survey, three family surveys (The Adult Family Survey, The Family/Guardian Survey and The Children/Family Survey) and The Staff Stability Survey.

The In Person Survey  
The In-Person Survey, formerly called the Adult Consumer Survey is completed with a minimum of 400 individuals (per participating state) who are 18 years of age or older and receiving at least one paid service in addition to case management. There are over 100 key outcome indicators in the survey that are designed to gather valid and reliable data across five broad domains: individual outcomes; family outcomes; health, welfare and rights; staff stability; and system performance.  The survey has three components; background data, and two interview sections.  The background data is most frequently completed by service coordinators prior to the face-to-face survey and includes information about general demographics; where people live, work, health information, etc.  The interview part of the survey must be conducted face to face with the individual receiving services.  The first section can only be answered by the individual. The second section of the survey may be completed by a proxy if the interviewer determines the individual cannot answer for him or herself or if the individual does not want to respond the NCI team provides training for interviewers who administer the survey.   Completed surveys are entered using a secure online data entry system designed by HSRI.

The National Core Indicator Family Surveys

The Adult Family Survey 
The Adult Family Survey is completed by a minimum of 400 respondents (per participating state) who have an adult family member with I/DD living in the family home.  This survey is mailed out to families to be completed.  Returned survey information is entered into a secure on-line data entry system designed and managed by HSRI.  States report response rates of between 35%- 40%.

The Family/Guardian Survey 
The Family/Guardian Survey is completed with a minimum of 400 respondents (per participating state) who have an adult family member with I/DD living outside the family home.  This survey is mailed out to families to be completed. Returned survey information is entered into a secure on-line data entry system designed and managed by HSRI.  States report response rates of between 35%- 40%.

The Children/Family Survey 
The Children/Family Survey is completed with a minimum of 400 respondents (per participating state) who have a child family member with I/DD living in the family home.  This survey is mailed out to families to be completed. Returned survey information is entered into a secure on-line data entry system designed and managed by HSRI. States report response rates of between 35%- 40%.

The Staff Stability Survey 
The Staff Stability Survey is completed by all  provider agencies (within participating states) supporting adults with I/DD in residential, employment, day services and other in-home or community inclusion programs.  The survey is intended to capture information about the direct support professional (DSP) workforce such as turnover, vacancy rates, wages, types of services provided, and benefits offered. Each state provides HSRI with agency emails and the provider agencies respond directly into HSRI's on-line data entry system.

Reports and publications 
Data from NCI surveys are aggregated and analyzed in reports produced yearly. These data are used to support state efforts to strengthen long term care policy, inform the conduct of quality assurance activities, and compare performance with national norms. Additionally, NCI data have been used as the basis of data briefs on specific areas of interest such as employment, dual diagnosis, self-directed services, and autism spectrum disorders, and the results of analyses of the multi-state dataset have been published in academic research journals and presented at conferences. NCI has also been cited as a "Resource on Autism" by NBC News. NCI indicators contribute to the calculation of state rankings in United Cerebral Palsy's report The Case for Inclusion.

Data from the National Core Indicators surveys also provide a rich source of data on demographics, personal characteristics, work status, and services received. These data, together with NCI data on outcomes, have been used in many peer-reviewed research articles and presentations. NCI data is available to researchers through a data request process.

References

External links 
 http://www.nationalcoreindicators.org/about/
 Measuring Developmental Disabilities Services' Success: http://www.governing.com/topics/health-human-services/col-measuring-developmental-disabilities-services-success.html

Joint ventures
Projects established in 1997
Disability in the United States